Mortimer railway station is a railway station in the village of Stratfield Mortimer in the county of Berkshire in England. The station is notable for its well-preserved Brunel-designed Great Western Railway (GWR) station buildings, which are still in use. The station is served by local services operated by Great Western Railway.

The station is on the double-track Reading to Basingstoke Line, and comprises two side platforms linked by a footbridge. Road access is to the north of the station, next to the up (Reading-bound) platform.

The brick-built single-storey main building has a ticket office and waiting room and is on the up platform. The down platform has a matching waiting shelter. Both buildings are Italianate, designed by Brunel for the GWR. The buildings are listed Grade II*.

History
The station was opened in 1848, along with the Reading to Basingstoke railway line and both it, and the station buildings, have been in continuous use ever since. The line was promoted by the nominally independent Berks and Hants Railway, but this company was absorbed into the GWR two years before Mortimer station opened. The approval of the Duke of Wellington, who lived nearby at Stratfield Saye House was required for the station's construction.

After railway nationalisation in 1948, operation of the Reading to Basingstoke line, and management of the station, was passed to the Southern Region of British Railways (BR). BR undertook major renovations of the station buildings in time for the celebrations of the 150th anniversary of the GWR, including removing the 1920s slates and replacing them with orange pantiles in the original style.

Following the privatisation of British Railways, the station is again served by trains running under the Great Western name.

Services
The station is served by Great Western Railway  —  local trains. There are generally two trains per hour in each direction on weekdays and Saturdays, and one train per hour on Sundays. Trains take 11 minutes to reach Reading, and 13 minutes to reach Basingstoke.

Cultural references
The station appears briefly in the 1974 BBC Doctor Who serial Planet of the Spiders.

References

External links 

 Video footage of the station on YouTube

Railway stations in Berkshire
DfT Category E stations
Former Great Western Railway stations
Railway stations in Great Britain opened in 1848
Railway stations served by Great Western Railway
Grade II* listed buildings in Berkshire
Grade II* listed railway stations
Isambard Kingdom Brunel railway stations